Prince Friedrich Karl Nikolaus of Prussia (20 March 1828 – 15 June 1885) was the son of Prince Charles of Prussia (1801–1883) and his wife, Princess Marie of Saxe-Weimar-Eisenach (1808–1877). Prince Friedrich Karl was a grandson of King Frederick William III of Prussia and a nephew of Frederick William IV and William I. 

As a military commander, the Prince had a major influence on the Royal Prussian Army's advances in training and tactics in the 1850s and 1860s. He commanded one of the armies which defeated the Austrian army at the Battle of Königgrätz in 1866 and the French Army of the Rhine at the Battle of Mars-la-Tour, overseeing the defeat of the Army of the Rhine at the Siege of Metz in 1870.

Biography
Friedrich Karl was born at the Royal Palace in Berlin on 20 March 1828, as the only son of Prince Charles of Prussia, the brother of future German emperor William I. From 1842 to 1846, Frederick Charles was under the military tutelage of then Major Albrecht von Roon. In 1845, the Prince joined the army and was sent to an infantry company. Roon accompanied the Prince to the University of Bonn in 1846. He was the first Hohenzollern prince to study in a university. He became a member of the Corps Borussia Bonn in 1847 and was awarded Prussia's Lifesaving Medal for rescuing a child from the Rhine the same year. After his studies, the Prince went back to his regiment in 1848, where he was promoted to captain. His company was issued the breech-loading Dreyse needle gun and the Prince produced an article on its probable future impact, writing that the troops could be prevented from firing off all their ammunition through good training and discipline. He served on Friedrich Graf von Wrangel's staff during the First Schleswig War of 1848. During the war Friedrich Karl received the Pour le Mérite. He shifted to the cavalry branch in October 1848 and was promoted to major in June 1849. He partook in a campaign in the Baden Revolution of 1849, during which he was wounded twice while leading a Guards Hussar squadron at the battle of Wiesenthal against Baden rebels. He continued to lead his squadron up till 1852.

In 1851, the Prince wrote a radical field manual for light troops, underlining the importance of training individual soldiers to take the initiative and not wait for orders. During the following peace years he was promoted to colonel in 1852 and granted the command of the Guards Dragoon Regiment, where he introduced realistic field exercises and insisted on combat readiness. He became major general and commander of the 1st Guards Cavalry Brigade in 1854 and lieutenant general in 1856. He commanded the 1st Guards Infantry Division from 19 February to 18 September 1857, but resigned after encountering significant opposition to his approach on training. In 1859, he published the study On French Tactics, which highlighted the decisiveness of troop morale. In 1860, the Prince published a military book, titled, "Eine militärische Denkschrift von P. F. K.", which contained a series of reform proposals. As commander of III Army Corps from 1 July 1860 to 17 July 1870, the Prince implemented his reforms and turned his corps into a leader in Prussian military innovation. 

Promoted to General der Kavallerie, the Prince took part in the Second Schleswig War of 1864 against Denmark, where he held command over the Prussian troops in the Austro-Prussian expeditionary force and defeated the Danes at the Battle of Dybbøl. In May 1864, he became supreme commander of the Austro-Prussian allied army and conquered Jutland. 

He served with distinction in the Austro-Prussian War where he commanded the First Army, consisting of the II, III, IV, and Cavalry corps. At the start of the war the prince's army marched to the East. This caused a gap between the First Army and the Second Army, however enabled it to link up with the Army of the Elbe. On June 28, the Prince and Karl Eberhard Herwarth von Bittenfeld attacked the Austrian Army at Munchengratz. They gained a victory in that battle and caused the Austrians to retreat to Jičín. On 29 June 1866, the prince ordered August von Werder, commanding the 3rd Division, to fight against the Austrians at Jičín. The 3rd Division was victorious in the resulting Battle of Gitschin but the campaign was ill regarded by the headquarters as it was outside of the strategic plans of King William of Prussia. Friedrich Karl was disappointed by the German General Staff in return. Meanwhile the combined operation of the two armies strained the supply lines and both Armies were starving. Chief of Staff Helmuth von Moltke inferred that the operational aim of Friedrich Karl was not to unite with the Second Army at Jičín but to capture Prague on his own. Before the Battle of Königgrätz, the troops of the prince were at Kamenitz. By his command the First Army was the first to arrive at Königgrätz. Along with the Army of the Elbe, the First Army held the numerically superior Austrians at bay for seven hours from 08:00 to 15:00, inflicting such massive casualties on the Austrians that it took the arrival of just one division from the Second Army, the latter commanded by his cousin the Crown Prince Frederick William, to complete the victory and cause the Austrians to order a general withdrawal at 15:00. The First Army then marched on Vienna. After the war, he was awarded the Grand Cross of the Pour le Mérite.

He was elected to the North German Reichstag in the February 1867 North German federal election, representing the East Prussian constituency of Labiau-Wehlau.

At the outbreak of the Franco-Prussian War, the Prince was given command of the Second Army, and defeated the French Army of the Rhine at the Battle of Mars-la-Tour on 16 August 1870, cutting off its escape route to the west. The battle was followed by another victory at Gravelotte-St.Privat on 18 August and the encirclement and annihilation of the Army of the Rhine at the Siege of Metz. After the fall of Metz on 27 October, his army was sent to the Loire to clear the area around Orléans, where French armies, first under Aurelle de Paladines, then under Chanzy, were trying to march north to relieve Paris. He won battles at Orléans on 2 December and Le Mans from 10–12 January 1871. For his services he was promoted to the rank of Generalfeldmarschall. After the war, the Prince was made Inspector-General and was given the rank of Field Marshal of Russia by Alexander II of Russia.

He died of a heart attack at Jagdschloss Glienicke on 15 June 1885. He became the namesake of SMS Friedrich Carl.

Family
On 29 November 1854 at Dessau he married Princess Maria Anna of Anhalt-Dessau (1837–1906), daughter of Leopold IV, Duke of Anhalt. He had met her at a hunt. They had five children:

Honours
He received the following decorations and awards:
German honours

Foreign honours

Ancestry

Portrayal in media
He is portrayed by German actor Barnaby Metschurat in the Danish miniseries 1864.

Bibliography

References

1828 births
1885 deaths
Military personnel from Berlin
People from the Province of Brandenburg
Frederick Charles
Field marshals of the German Empire
Field marshals of Prussia
Field marshals of Russia
Prussian military personnel of the Second Schleswig War
Prussian people of the Austro-Prussian War
German military personnel of the Franco-Prussian War
University of Bonn alumni
Recipients of the Grand Cross of the Iron Cross
Recipients of the Pour le Mérite (military class)
Grand Crosses of the Military Order of Max Joseph
Grand Crosses of the Order of Saint Stephen of Hungary
Commanders Cross of the Military Order of Maria Theresa
Knights Grand Cross of the Royal Order of Kalākaua
Knights Grand Cross of the Military Order of William
Recipients of the Order of St. George of the Second Degree
Recipients of the Order of St. Anna, 1st class
Knights of the Golden Fleece of Spain
Honorary Knights Grand Cross of the Order of the Bath
Knights Grand Cross of the Military Order of Savoy
Recipients of the Gold Medal of Military Valor